The 1938 Campeonato Paulista da Primeira Divisão, organized by the LFESP (Liga de Futebol do Estado de São Paulo), was the 37th season of São Paulo's top professional football league. Corinthians won the title for the 10th time. no teams were relegated and the top scorer was São Paulo's Elyseu with 13 goals.

System
The championship was disputed in a single-round robin system, with the team with the most points winning the title.

Due to the national team's preparation for the World Cup, the championship was interrupted in April, and would return only in late September. To avoid having the teams spend five months without any activity, an extra tournament was created to fill the teams' schedules. That tournament would have the teams divided into three groups of four, with each playing the teams in its own group twice, and the champions of Group B qualifying directly to the Finals, while the champions of Groups A and C played each other to define the other finalist. Palestra Itália won that tournament, beating Corinthians in the Finals, and to this day there is a debate about whether the extra tournament qualifies as a Paulista championship.

Extra tournament

First stage

Group A

Group B

Group C

Semifinals

Finals

Championship

References

Campeonato Paulista seasons
Paulista